Miss Nightingale at Scutari, 1854, also known as The Lady with the Lamp, is an 1891 painting by Henrietta Rae.  It depicts Florence Nightingale at Scutari Hospital during the Crimean War.

The painting is a romanticised three-quarter-length portrait of Nightingale, depicted as a young woman swathed in a white shawl, carrying an oil lamp as she looks down on a wounded soldier, wearing his redcoat draped over his shoulders with its arms around his neck.  Other wounded soldiers lie in the background, below military flags.

The painting was commissioned by the publishers Cassell & Co for reproduction as a chromolithograph with their "Yule Tide" Christmas annual in 1891, entitled "The Lady with the Lamp".

The location of the original oil painting is not known.

References
 Heart and Soul: The Story of Florence Nightingale, Gena K. Gorrell, p. 86
 Romantic artwork is popular with visitors, The Scarborough News, 19 July 2015
 Florence Nightingale, National Portrait Gallery
 Crimean War: Florence Nightingale with her lamp at a patient's bedside. Colour lithograph, 1891, after H. Rae , Wellcome Collection Library
 The lady with the lamp (Miss Nightingale at Scutari, 1854), Library of Congress

1891 paintings
Portraits of women
Women in art
Cultural depictions of Florence Nightingale
Medicine in art
English paintings